Sandra Maas (born January 13, 1963) is an American journalist, newscaster and women’s rights activist.  She has worked in the San Diego, California area since 1990 and has been nominated for 13 regional Emmy awards.

Early life and education  
Sandra Lynn Maas was born on January 13, 1963, raised in Mission Viejo, California.  Her father, Frank Maas, owned a window tinting business and her mother, Dorothea (Brockman) Maas, was an elementary school principal.  She graduated summa cum laude from California State University, Chico, with a Bachelor of Arts degree in communications in 1985. During college, Maas worked as a news anchor for KCHO Chico and KPAY radio, Redding.  She transitioned to television during her senior year in college, serving as weeknight co-anchor at ABC affiliate, KRCR-TV.

Career 
In 1986, Maas moved to NBC affiliate KSBY-TV in San Luis Obispo, California, where she co-anchored the 6 and 11 p.m. newscasts.  Maas also served as the station's medical reporter at the start of the AIDS crisis, earning a Golden Mike Award for her on-air work.
In 1990, Maas relocated to San Diego and CBS Affiliate KFMB-TV, where she co-anchored News 8 at 4pm with Mitch Duncan.  In addition, she served as the station's medical reporter and worked for CBS Newspath as a national medical correspondent. During this time, Maas was also a regular fill-in on the Jeff and Jer Morning Show on Star 94.1. In 1993, she had a bit part in the CBS soap opera, The Young and the Restless, playing the role of nurse Sally Winslow. In 2001, Maas was part of a mass exodus that left KFMB-TV when it severed ties with the American Federation of Television and Radio Artists.  She resigned after an unsuccessful contract renegotiation. In 2002, Maas was a freelance journalist for then-Fox affiliate XETV in San Diego. In 2004, Maas moved to KUSI-TV, serving first as a co-anchor on Good Morning San Diego and in 2006 adding host duties for the lifestyle show Inside San Diego with Andrea Naversen. In 2009, she became weeknight co-anchor of The KUSI News at 6 and 10pm with Allen Denton.

Maas has been mistress of ceremonies of the Ernst & Young Entrepreneur of the Year Awards since 1993.  She also volunteers as Mistress of Ceremonies or moderator for several non-profit organization events. 

In 2020 Maas joined the board of the “Women’s Museum of California” in San Diego and launched “Trailblazing Women,” a video series for the Women’s Museum of California, where she serves on the board as Vice President of External Affairs.

Equal pay lawsuit 
On June 25, 2019 Maas filed a lawsuit alleging discriminatory practices by KUSI-TV and station General Manager Mike McKinnon Jr. in particular. She claims she was abruptly terminated for attempting to open a dialogue about compensation. The trial started on February 3, 2023.

Awards 

 Maas has been nominated for 13 regional Emmy awards.  
 In 2011, she received an Associated Press Mark Twain Award for her contribution to “Oxy: What Your Kids Aren’t Telling You,” and a San Diego Press Club Award for investigative reporting.  
 She has also received a Golden Mike Award and has been inducted into The Silver Circle of The National Academy of Television Arts & Sciences. 
 In 2016 Maas was honored as a "Woman of Dedication" by the Salvation Army for her philanthropic work.
 In 2017, Maas was recognized by Ranch & Coast Magazine as "Best News Personality."
 In 2021, Maas was honored by The San Diego Business Journal as a "Woman of Influence."

Community contributions
Maas served as moderator for the Greater San Diego Regional Chamber of Commerce Congressional Delegation debate.  She has also hosted The San Diego County District Attorney's "The National Crime Vigil."

She has hosted or acted as mistress of ceremonies for fundraisers for the Salvation Army, the Make-A-Wish Foundation, The ARC-San Diego, and Rady Children's Hospital (where she serves on the auxiliary board).

References

External links

Living people
Television personalities from California
People from California
American women television journalists
1963 births
21st-century American women